Safet Hadžić (born 6 October 1968) is a Slovenian professional football manager and former player. He was most recently the manager of Slovenian Second League club Triglav Kranj.

References

External links
NZS profile 

1968 births
Living people
Footballers from Ljubljana
Yugoslav footballers
Slovenian footballers
Association football defenders
Slovenian PrvaLiga players
ND Gorica players
NK Celje players
NK Olimpija Ljubljana (1945–2005) players
NK Domžale players
NK Mura players
NK Ivančna Gorica players
NK Ljubljana players
NK Olimpija Ljubljana (2005) players
Slovenian football managers
NK Ljubljana managers
NK Olimpija Ljubljana (2005) managers
Slovenian people of Bosniak descent